The giant redfin (Pseudobarbus skeltoni) is an African freshwater fish species in the family Cyprinidae.

It is endemic to the Breede River system in South Africa.

References 

Pseudobarbus
Freshwater fish of South Africa
Fish described in 2013
Taxa named by Albert Chakona
Taxa named by Ernst R. Swartz